A month of the shamanic calendar of the Eurasian nomadic peoples, particularly the Turks. Oshlaq-ay began around March 21 with the celebration of Ulugh Kun.

References
Kevin Alan Brook. The Jews of Khazaria. 2nd ed. Rowman & Littlefield Publishers, Inc, 2006.

See also
Spring Festivals

Asian shamanism
Eurasian shamanism